Electr-O-Pura is the seventh studio album by American indie rock band Yo La Tengo, released on May 2, 1995 by record label Matador. The album received very positive reviews from music critics.

Recording and release 

Electr-O-Pura was recorded at Alex the Great Studios in Nashville, Tennessee and produced by Roger Moutenot, who recorded the band's previous album, Painful. The band named the album after an extinct soda brand; they discovered the name while they were visiting the Museum of Beverage Containers in Nashville while the album was still in production. The hyphens were added as the band's "own editorial comment." Electr-O-Pura was released on May 2, 1995 by the independent record label Matador Records. The song "Tom Courtenay", which is a tribute to the English film star, was released as a single on March 21, 1995.

In the back of the CD case, the songs are deliberately listed with wrong running times to fool listeners. As singer and guitarist Ira Kaplan explains, "I think sometimes people have a tendency to look at a song and say, 'Oh, it's six minutes long. This is gonna suck. Pop songs should be three minutes.' So we thought we'd say, 'Oh yeah, we agree with you completely', and have people not go into 'Flying Lesson' or 'Blue Line Swinger' already armed to not like this song, and maybe trick them into listening to it once." The alternate titles were lifted from a book on the Blues Project.

Critical reception 

Electr-O-Pura received very positive reviews from music critics. Steven Mirkin, writing for Entertainment Weekly, commented: "Combining homespun charm, critical sophistication, and a fan's enthusiasm, Yo La Tengo sounds like a well-adjusted Velvet Underground. Electr-O-Puras songs run the gamut from loopy pop to pensive folk to flat-out weird; their unpretentious honesty brings them together into a musically and emotionally satisfying whole."

In 1996, the album was ranked at number 9 in The Village Voices Pazz & Jop critics' poll for 1995. Similarly, Spin placed the album at number 11 on their list of the "20 Best Albums of '95".

Track listing

References

External links 

1995 albums
Albums produced by Roger Moutenot
Matador Records albums
Yo La Tengo albums